Sven Ingemar Ljungh, also spelled Liungh (5 June 1757, Björkö, Jönköping County – 12 September 1828, Bälaryd, Jönköping County) was a Swedish civil servant, naturalist and collector. During his schooling in Jönköping, he was a private student of the lexicographer Håkan Sjögren from whom he learned the Latin language. At high school in Växjö, he received a good education in botany. He attended the gymnasium in Växjö and went to Uppsala in 1775, graduating in 1777 with a degree in theology. He then started to study medicine but fell ill to malaria. After recovery he joined the civil services. He took up a position in the Swedish civil service as a clerk in the judicial system and in 1778 became the Deputy Crown Bailiff in North and South Vedbo. He took an interest in natural history and was a visitor to the home of Carolus Linnaeus and was taught briefly by Linnaeus the younger.

He was a scholar who exchanged correspondence with many contemporary scientists including Carl Thunberg, G Marklin, Erik Acharius, Fr Ehrhart, Jan Brandes and others. As a collector of rodents, insects, birds and molluscs, he described many new species. He also worked on agriculture and meteorology and for his work on the former received the Order of Vasa.

In 1803 his insect collection had an estimated 5000-6000 species and he published many notes on exotic animals from Java, Ceylon and the Cape. After his death, none of his sons took an interest in natural history and his collections were sold.

References

External links
 Biography on Swedish archives (in Swedish)

1757 births
1828 deaths
People from Vetlanda Municipality
Swedish naturalists
Members of the Royal Swedish Academy of Sciences
Recipients of the Order of Vasa
Members of the Royal Society of Sciences and Letters in Gothenburg